Mahabirganj is a village with a population of 225 lies in north east corner of Parsathua market in Rohtas district in the Indian state of Bihar. It is 41 km from the district headquarters Sasaram and 22 km from Kudra and the same distance from Mohania, the location of Bhabua Road railway station. This village is situated around 0.5 km north of National Highway 30. The nearest market, Parsathua, is 1.25 km from here, the nearest school colleges are 1.25 km away and the nearest hospital is 11 km away. An electric distribution center is the main landmark of this village. There is no water supply and the village can be reached by bus or minibus.
This village is still not connected with National High Way 30 while its distance from this High Way is hardly 500 m. No any government plans has facilitated this villages. There is quite lack of ground facilities in this village like primary school, pukka lanes, drainage systems, hospital, and play ground. Villagers have tried many times for these facilities but no use. Political Parties members come here in time of election after that no one is to help these villages. 
The main lifeline are means of income is cultivation and animal husbandry. Label of education is average here.

References 

Villages in Rohtas district